Siniša Končalović (born 24 October 1966) is a Croatian retired footballer who played as a midfielder for clubs in Yugoslavia, Spain, Greece, Portugal, Austria and Belgium.

Club career
Born in Osijek, Končalović began playing football for local side NK Osijek.

In 1992, Končalović joined Greek Superleague side Panachaiki F.C. for the two seasons appearing in 31 league matches for the club.

References

External links
 
 
 Profile at rafc.br
 ΞΕΝΟΙ ΠΑΙΚΤΕΣ ΚΑΙ ΠΡΟΠΟΝΗΤΕΣ ΤΗΣ ΠΑΝΑΧΑΪΚΗΣ

1968 births
Living people
Footballers from Osijek
Association football midfielders
Yugoslav footballers
Croatian footballers
NK Osijek players
RCD Mallorca players
Panachaiki F.C. players
C.F. Estrela da Amadora players
SK Vorwärts Steyr players
Royal Antwerp F.C. players
K.F.C. Verbroedering Geel players
R. Olympic Charleroi Châtelet Farciennes players
Royal Cappellen F.C. players
Yugoslav First League players
La Liga players
Primeira Liga players
Super League Greece players
Belgian Pro League players
Croatian expatriate footballers
Expatriate footballers in Spain
Expatriate footballers in Greece
Expatriate footballers in Portugal
Expatriate footballers in Austria
Expatriate footballers in Belgium
Croatian expatriate sportspeople in Spain
Croatian expatriate sportspeople in Greece
Croatian expatriate sportspeople in Portugal
Croatian expatriate sportspeople in Austria
Croatian expatriate sportspeople in Belgium